Bishop's Hill Wood is a  biological Site of Special Scientific Interest (SSSI) in England. It lies just to the east of the village of Wickwar, South Gloucestershire and was notified in 1984.

References

Sites of Special Scientific Interest in Avon
South Gloucestershire District
Sites of Special Scientific Interest notified in 1984
Forests and woodlands of Gloucestershire